Yau Ma Tei, formerly named Waterloo after Waterloo Road, is an MTR station located in Yau Ma Tei, Kowloon. The station opened on 22 December 1979 and was renamed as Yau Ma Tei on 31 May 1985 along with Argyle (Mong Kok) and Chater (Central).

Yau Ma Tei is an interchange station, even though the platforms are not designed for cross-platform interchange. This station is used by many students during commuting hours, since it is in the vicinity of many large schools.

The station's livery colour is a light grey. Red, white, and blue stripes, which is located prominently adorned the station walls until they were removed as part of renovation works in 2005 which also saw the original Helvetica typeface, used in station name signs, replaced by Myriad.

History 
However, Yau Ma Tei station was opened on 22nd of that month as an infill station. When the station was first opened, only upper level platform was in use. Two weeks before Tsuen Wan line opened, on 26 April 1982, MTR Corporation split the Modified Initial System into Kwun Tong line and Tsuen Wan line, in order to let passengers to get used to transfer at Mong Kok station. On the same day, the lower level platform was put into use. Tsuen Wan line was fully operational on 17 May 1982.

Kwun Tong line was extended to Whampoa station on 23 October 2016.

Station layout 
From the scissor crossing after Whampoa terminus to north of Yau Ma Tei, the Kwun Tong line drives on the right side of the tunnel, as opposed to almost everywhere else in the MTR, where the driving direction is usually on the left (except for the ). The difference in driving directionality is due to the track layout between Yau Ma Tei and Mong Kok stations.

The Kwun Tong line extension towards Whampoa station via  opened on 23 October 2016. In preparation, the numbers of the Kwun Tong line platforms were swapped starting on 11 June 2016, and platform 4 became alighting-only (and platform 3 boarding-only) from 21 August 2016. After the opening of the Kwun Tong line extension, Yau Ma Tei became an interchange station between the Kwun Tong line and the Tsuen Wan line, with each line using platforms on a different level.

Entrances/exits
 A1: Pitt Street
 A2: Pitt Street, YMCA Kowloon Centre, Kwong Wah Hospital
 B1: Nathan Road
 B2: Portland Street
 C: Man Ming Lane (for Temple Street) 
 D: Waterloo Road

Gallery

References

Kwun Tong line
MTR stations in Kowloon
Railway stations in Hong Kong opened in 1979
Tsuen Wan line
Yau Ma Tei